The women's long jump at the 2017 World Championships in Athletics was held at the Olympic Stadium on 9 and 11 August.

Summary
In 2016, Darya Klishina was notable as the only Russian athlete allowed to participate in the Olympic track and field schedule, finishing 9th. Here as an Authorised Neutral Athlete, she made her mark on the athletic field taking the early lead with a 6.78 metre jump in the first round. Later in the round Brittney Reese pulled close with her 6.75 metres. With her 6.96 metres, Ivana Španović jumped into the lead near the beginning of the second round. Klishina followed with an improvement to 6.88 metres. Near the end of the third round, Reese hit her 7.02 metres which turned out to be the winner. Reese didn't hit another fair jump, but didn't need to. Klishina improved in the fourth round but didn't change her place until her 7.00 metres in the fifth round put her into silver. On her final attempt, defending champion and Olympic champion Tianna Bartoletta moved from fifth to third with a 6.97 metre jump. Klishina joined Sergey Shubenkov as the second medalist of the Authorised Neutral Athletes, both silver.

Reese became the second athlete after Valerie Adams to win a World Championship in the same event four times.

Records
Before the competition records were as follows:

No records were set at the competition.

Qualification standard
The standard to qualify automatically for entry was 6.75 metres.

Schedule
The event schedule, in local time (UTC+1), is as follows:

Results

Qualification
The qualification round took place on 9 August, in two groups, both starting at 19:10. Athletes attaining a mark of at least 6.70 metres ( Q ) or at least the 12 best performers ( q ) qualified for the final. The overall results were as follows: In rainy conditions, no athlete was able to make the automatic qualifying mark.

Final
The final took place on 11 August at 19:10. The start list was as follows:

References

Long jump
Long jump at the World Athletics Championships
2017 in women's athletics